Semenre, also Smenre or Semenenre, is a poorly attested Theban pharaoh during the Second Intermediate Period of Egypt who succeeded the equally obscure Nebiriau II. He reigned from 1601 to 1600 BC (Kim Ryholt) or ca. 1580 BC (Detlef Franke) and belonged to the 16th Dynasty (Ryholt) or the 17th Dynasty (Franke).

For this ruler only the throne name is known, carved on a tin-bronze axe head of unknown provenance, now in the Petrie Museum, London (UC30079). He is possibly also listed on the Turin Canon (11.7).
Semenre was succeeded by Seuserenre Bebiankh who left behind more traces of building projects and mining activity in his reign than most kings of this dynasty with the exception of Djehuti.

References

17th-century BC Pharaohs
16th-century BC Pharaohs
Pharaohs of the Sixteenth Dynasty of Egypt